The canton of Sézanne-Brie et Champagne is an administrative division of the Marne department, northeastern France. It was created at the French canton reorganisation which came into effect in March 2015. Its seat is in Sézanne.

It consists of the following communes:
 
Allemant
Barbonne-Fayel
Bergères-sous-Montmirail
Bethon
Boissy-le-Repos
Bouchy-Saint-Genest
Broussy-le-Petit
Broyes
Champguyon
Chantemerle
Charleville
Châtillon-sur-Morin
Chichey
Corfélix
Corrobert
Courgivaux
Escardes
Les Essarts-le-Vicomte
Les Essarts-lès-Sézanne
Esternay
Fontaine-Denis-Nuisy
La Forestière
Fromentières
Le Gault-Soigny
Gaye
Janvilliers
Joiselle
Lachy
Linthelles
Linthes
Mécringes
Le Meix-Saint-Epoing
Mœurs-Verdey
Mondement-Montgivroux
Montgenost
Montmirail
Morsains
Nesle-la-Reposte
Neuvy
La Noue
Oyes
Péas
Queudes
Reuves
Réveillon
Rieux
Saint-Bon
Saint-Loup
Saint-Remy-sous-Broyes
Saudoy
Sézanne
Soizy-aux-Bois
Le Thoult-Trosnay
Tréfols
Vauchamps
Verdon
Le Vézier
Villeneuve-la-Lionne
La Villeneuve-lès-Charleville
Villeneuve-Saint-Vistre-et-Villevotte
Vindey

References

Cantons of Marne (department)